Stoneleigh: a natural garden is a 42-acre property in Villanova, Pennsylvania, owned by Natural Lands, a land conservation non-profit organization founded in 1953 and headquartered in Media, Pennsylvania. 

On April 20, 2016, the children of the late John and Chara Haas donated the family’s 42-acre Stoneleigh estate to Natural Lands. “This remarkable act of generosity marks a turning point for both Stoneleigh and for our organization,” said Molly Morrison, then president of Natural Lands. “We are deeply honored to be entrusted to carry on the Haas family’s legacy of stewardship for this magical place, and excited beyond measure to add Stoneleigh as a unique, shining star in our constellation of preserves."

History
Stoneleigh’s history dates back to 1877 when Edmund Smith, a rising executive with the Pennsylvania Railroad Company, purchased 65 acres of land in Villanova and constructed a residence there. In 1900, Samuel Bodine, head of United Gas Improvement Company, acquired the property.

Following Samuel Bodine’s death in 1932, Stoneleigh was subdivided and sold. Otto Haas, entrepreneur and co-founder of Rohm and Haas Company, purchased the southwestern portion of the estate, launching a more than 80-year tenure of careful stewardship by the Haas family.

Otto and Phoebe’s son, John, and his wife, Chara, acquired Stoneleigh in 1964 and lived there for the next five decades.

The property includes trees, pathways, and gardens that the Haas family has carefully stewarded over the decades. The gardens were designed by a number of notable landscape architects over the past century—including Olmsted Brothers, sons of the famed Frederick Law Olmsted.

The Tudor Revival mansion serves both as home to the Organ Historical Society, an international non-profit organization dedicated to celebrating, studying, and preserving pipe organ history, and a space for a wide variety of programs.

Stoneleigh: a natural garden opened to guests in May 2018. Stoneleigh is a unique public garden blending history, horticulture, ecological and conservation values, and Natural Lands’ emphasis on access to nature for all. There is no admission fee to visit Stoneleigh.

The property joins the dozens of public gardens in the Greater Philadelphia area, which is considered "America's Garden Capital" with more than 30 gardens within 30 miles of Center City Philadelphia.

Controversy
Just days before Stoneleigh: a natural garden's grand opening in May, 2018, Natural Lands faced a fight to save the property. The Lower Merion School District announced its intention to seize the historic gardens and buildings by eminent domain to construct a new middle school and sports complex in their place. In response, Natural Lands launched its campaign to Save Stoneleigh, which garnered immediate and overwhelming support from the greater community.

One month later, supporters in the Pennsylvania legislature joined the fight and introduced House Bill 2468. The Bill passed within days and with remarkable bipartisan support. The new law—Act 45—requires Orphans' Court approval before any entity can seize a property preserved by a conservation easement.

References

External links
  Stoneleigh (website)
  Stoneleigh (Organ Historical Society)

Protected areas of Delaware County, Pennsylvania
Gardens in Pennsylvania
Botanical gardens in Pennsylvania